Papilio acheron is a species of butterfly in the family Papilionidae. It is endemic to East Malaysia.

References

 Gimenez Dixon, M. 1996.  Papilio acheron.   2006 IUCN Red List of Threatened Species.   Downloaded on 31 July 2007.

Endemic fauna of Malaysia
Invertebrates of Malaysia
acheron
Taxonomy articles created by Polbot
Butterflies described in 1877